Maury Yeston (born October 23, 1945) is an American composer, lyricist and music theorist.

He is known as the initiator of new Broadway musicals and writing their music and lyrics, as well as a classical orchestral and ballet composer, Yale University professor, and prominent Music Theorist authoring landmark works in that field. Among his musicals are Nine in 1982, and Titanic in 1997, both of which won him Tony Awards for Best Musical and Best Score and each brought him nominations for a Grammy in addition to his third Grammy nomination and another Tony Award for Best Revival for the revival of Nine in 2004. He also won two Drama Desk Awards for Nine, and was nominated for both an Academy Award and a Golden Globe for two of his new songs in the film version of Nine.  Yeston also wrote over a third of the score and most of the lyrics to Broadway's Grand Hotel in 1989, which was Tony-nominated for best musical along with Yeston for best score, and another two Drama Desk Awards nominations for his music and lyrics, and ran more than a thousand performances.

His musical version of the novel The Phantom of the Opera entitled Phantom has appeared in over 1,000 productions worldwide, across America, Japan, Korea, the UK, Germany, Poland, Australia, and other countries. He has also written a number of other off-Broadway musicals, including Death Takes a Holiday, nominated for eleven Drama Desk Awards; December Songs, a classical crossover song cycle commissioned by Carnegie Hall for its centennial celebration;  An American Cantata (a three-movement Choral Symphony commissioned by the John F. Kennedy Center for the Performing Arts for the Millennium celebration); Tom Sawyer: A Ballet in Three Acts – a full-length story-ballet commissioned by the Kansas City Ballet for the opening of the new  Kauffman Center for the Performing Arts in Kansas City; a Cello Concerto, premiered by Yo-Yo Ma with Sir Gilbert Levine conducting  and other pieces for both Chamber ensembles and solo piano, in addition to his off-Broadway revue Anything Can Happen In the Theater.

Yeston served on the board of the Songwriters Hall of Fame and is, in addition, a lifetime member of the Dramatists Guild Council, an honorary ambassador of the Society of Composers & Lyricists, past president of the Kleban Foundation, a founding member of the Society for Music Theory, serves on the editorial boards of Musical Quarterly and the Kurt Weill Foundation Publication Project and on the advisory board of the Yale University Press Broadway Series.  He was an Associate Professor of Music and Director of Undergraduate Studies in Music at Yale for eight years, authoring two music theory scholarly books published by Yale Press, and subsequently presided over and taught the BMI Lehman Engel Musical Theater Workshop in New York City for more than two decades beginning in 1982.

Life and career

Early years
Yeston was born in Jersey City, New Jersey. His English-born father, David, founded the Dial Import Corporation, an importing and exporting firm, and his mother, Frances, helped run the business.  But the family loved music.  His father sang English music hall songs, and his mother was an accomplished pianist.  Yeston noted in a 1997 interview, "My mother was trained in classical piano, and her father was a cantor in a synagogue.  A lot of musical theatre writers have something in common. Irving Berlin, George Gershwin, Harold Arlen, Kurt Weill – each one had a cantor in the family. When you take a young, impressionable child and put him at age three in the middle of a synagogue, and that child sees a man in a costume, dramatically raised up on a kind of stage, singing his heart out at the top of his lungs to a rapt congregation, it makes a lasting impression." At age five, Yeston began taking piano lessons from his mother, and by age seven he had won an award for composition.  He attended the Yeshiva of Hudson County through grade eight.  Yeston's interest in musical theatre began at age ten when his mother took him to see My Fair Lady on Broadway.  At Jersey Academy, a small private high school in Jersey City, Yeston broadened his musical study beyond classical and religious music and Broadway show tunes to include jazz, folk, rock and roll, and early music. A progressive school, many of its faculty members held an internationalist and cosmopolitan worldview they shared with the students that included French Symbolist, 20th-century German and Russian poetry, Whitman and Hart Crane, European Classical music, and in particular foreign films - which included the masterpieces of the Italian neo-realists, Satyajit Ray, Fellini, Antonioni, Bergman, Andrzej Wajda and Akira Kurosawa among others, influencing him and other of the students as well.  He took up folk guitar, played vibraphone with a jazz group, and participated in madrigal singing.

As an undergraduate at Yale University Yeston majored in music theory and composition, writing an atonal sonata for piano, original incidental music for a production of Brecht’s Life of Galileo, and a cello concerto that won Yale's Friends of Music Prize, and minored in philosophy and literature, particularly French, German, and Japanese.  Yeston noted, "I am as much a lyricist as a composer, and the musical theatre is the only genre I know in which the lyrics are as important as the music."  After graduating from Yale in 1967, Yeston attended Clare College, Cambridge University on a two-year Mellon Fellowship where he continued his studies in musicology and composition.  There, he belonged to Cambridge Footlights Dramatic Club and wrote several classical pieces, including a set of atonal songs for soprano and a Nonet for Three String Quartets in addition to a musical version of Alice in Wonderland, eventually produced at the Long Wharf Theatre in Connecticut in 1971.  At Cambridge, he focused his musical goals, moving from classical composition to theatre songwriting.  Upon earning his Master's Degree there, Yeston returned to the United States to accept a Woodrow Wilson Fellowship to teach for a year at Lincoln University in Pennsylvania, the country's oldest traditionally black college.  At Lincoln, Yeston taught music, art history, philosophy and Western Civilization, and history of African-American music.

He then pursued a musicology doctorate at Yale and enrolled in the BMI Lehman Engel Musical Theater Workshop, traveling to New York City each week, where he and other aspiring composer/lyricists, including Ed Kleban, Alan Menken, and Howard Ashman, were able to try out material for established Broadway producers and directors.  He completed his Ph.D. at Yale in 1974, with his dissertation published as a book by Yale University Press: The Stratification of Musical Rhythm (1976), a seminal music theory text noted for its groundbreaking innovation in the theory of rhythm and its original redefinition of the concept of musical meter (recently republished in Chinese). Soon afterwards, his cello concerto was premiered by Yo-Yo Ma and the Norwalk Symphony under the baton of Sir Gilbert Levine.  He then joined the Yale Music Dept. faculty where he taught for eight years, serving as Associate Professor and Director of Undergraduate Studies in Music, and also creating Yale's first African-American music undergraduate lecture course in the History of Jazz.  He subsequently published another Theory book with Yale University Press, Readings in Schenker Analysis and Other Approaches (editor, 1977), and was twice cited by the student body as one of Yale's ten best professors.

Musical theatre career
Nine and La Cage
While teaching at Yale, Yeston continued to attend the BMI workshop principally to work on his project, begun in 1973, to write a musical inspired by Federico Fellini's 1963 film 8½.  As a teenager, Yeston had seen the film, about a film director suffering a midlife crisis and a creativity drought, and he was intrigued by its themes. "I looked at the screen and said 'That's me.' I still believed in all the dreams and ideals of what it was to be an artist, and here was a movie about... an artist in trouble.  It became an obsession," Yeston told The New York Times in 1982.  Yeston called the musical Nine (the age of the director in his flashback), explaining that if you add music to 8½, "it's like half a number more."

In 1978, at the O'Neill Conference, Yeston and director Howard Ashman held a staged reading of Nine. Unbeknownst to him, Katharine Hepburn was in the audience, and after seeing it and liking it, she wrote to Fellini saying she had seen a wonderful show based on his movie. When Yeston went to ask permission to make the show a musical, Fellini told him he already received a letter from Hepburn and gave him permission.  Playwright Mario Fratti had written the book, but the producers and director Tommy Tune eventually decided his script did not work, and brought in Arthur Kopit in 1981 to write an entirely new book.  The show originally had male and female parts, but Yeston was not satisfied with the men auditioning, except Raul Julia. They had liked a lot of the women who had auditioned, so Tune suggested casting them all. Yeston began work on choral arrangements for 24 women. And since he had so many women, Yeston thought, instead of having the band play the overture, have all the women sing it. Once Liliane Montevecchi joined the cast, Yeston was so impressed with her voice he wrote Folies Bergere just for her. He also expanded Call From The Vatican for Anita Morris once he discovered she could sing a high C.

In 1981, while collaborating on Nine, Tune asked Yeston to write incidental music for an American production of Caryl Churchill's play Cloud Nine.  Tune was also engaged to work on the musical La Cage aux Folles that was based on the 1978 film of the same name, and the producer, Allan Carr, was seeking a composer.  Yeston was engaged to write the music, with a book by Jay Presson Allen.  Their stage version of the film was to be called The Queen of Basin Street and set in New Orleans; it was hoped to be staged in 1981. Mike Nichols was set to direct and Tommy Tune to choreograph.  Yeston took time off from Yale to work on the project and had already written several jazzy songs, but Carr was unable to put together the financing for the show, and the project was postponed.  Carr searched for executive producers and found them in Fritz Holt and Barry Brown, who immediately fired the entire creative team that Carr had assembled, except for Yeston, who later withdrew from the project.  These creatives, other than Yeston, eventually filed lawsuits, but only Yeston eventually collected an ongoing permanent royalty from La Cage.

Meanwhile, Yeston and Tune turned back to Nine, which opened on Broadway on May 9, 1982, at the 46th Street Theatre and ran for 729 performances. The cast included Raul Julia as Guido. The musical won five Tony Awards, including best musical, and Yeston won for best score. A London production and a successful Broadway revival of Nine followed in 2003, starring Antonio Banderas and winning the Tony Award for Best Revival of a Musical.  In 2009, a film version of Nine, directed by Rob Marshall and starring Daniel Day-Lewis and Marion Cotillard, was released. Yeston wrote three new songs for the film and was nominated for the 2009 Academy Award for Best Original Song for "Take It All" and the Golden Globe Award for Best Original Song ("Cinema Italiano").

Phantom and next projects
After the success of Nine, Yeston left his position as associate professor at Yale, although he continued to teach a course there every other semester alternating between songwriting and Schubert Lieder.  He then turned to writing a musical version of Gaston Leroux's novel, The Phantom of the Opera.  He was approached with the idea by actor/director Geoffrey Holder, who held the American rights to the novel.  Initially, Yeston was skeptical of the project.  "I laughed and laughed.... That's the worst idea in the world!  Why would you want to write a musical based on a horror story?....  And then it occurred to me that the story could be somewhat changed....  [The Phantom] would be a Quasimodo character, an Elephant Man.  Don't all of us feel, despite outward imperfections, that deep inside we're good?  And that is a character you cry for."

Yeston had completed much of Phantom and was in the process of raising money for a Broadway production when Andrew Lloyd Webber announced plans for his own musical version of the story. After Lloyd Webber's show became a smash hit in London in 1986, Yeston's version could not get funding for a Broadway production.  However, in 1991, it premiered in full-scale, top-quality production at Houston's Theatre Under the Stars and has since received over 1,000 productions around the world.  The Houston production was recorded as an original cast album by RCA records.  Yeston's Phantom is more operetta-like in style than Lloyd Webber's, seeking to reflect the 1890s period, and seeks to project a French atmosphere to reflect its Parisian setting.

Meanwhile, Yeston's In the Beginning, a musical poking good-natured fun at the first five books of the Bible from the perspective of ordinary people living through the events described, had been workshopped at the Manhattan Theatre Club with an initial Book by Larry Gelbart under the title 1-2-3-4-5 in 1987 and 1988.  After various revisions and tryouts, it was finally produced under its current title at Maine State Music Theatre in 1998. A producer introduced Yeston to Alan Jay Lerner to show him a song from the show, "New Words", and "Lerner thought the song was so wonderful he invited me to stop by his office every couple of weeks so he could give me pointers. He said Oscar Hammerstein had done that for him and he wanted to do that for me. So, I really got coaching lessons – mentoring – in a series of meetings with Alan Jay Lerner as a result of having written that song." In 1988 Yeston recorded a studio album of the musical Goya: A Life in Song, produced by the noted Phil Ramone. Plácido Domingo sang the role of Spanish painter Francisco de Goya, with Jennifer Rush, Gloria Estefan, Dionne Warwick, Richie Havens, and Seiko Matsuda.  Domingo was interested in starring in a stage musical about Goya and suggested to producer Alan Carr that Yeston would be the right person to create the vehicle since Domingo had admired Yeston's work on Nine.  Because of Domingo's time commitments, the musical was made into a concept album instead.

Grand Hotel and December Songs
Also in 1989, Tommy Tune, who had directed Nine, asked Yeston to improve the score of Grand Hotel, a musical that was doing badly in tryouts. The show was based on the 1932 film of the same name and on an unsuccessful 1958 musical At the Grand, with a score by Robert Wright and George Forrest. Yeston wrote eight new songs for Grand Hotel and revised much of the existing 1958 lyrics. After Grand Hotel opened on Broadway in November 1989, Yeston, along with Wright and Forrest, was nominated for the Tony Award and two Drama Desk Awards for best score. The show ran for 1,077 performances.

After this, Yeston wrote December Songs (1991), a song cycle inspired by Franz Schubert's Winterreise.  December Songs was written as a commissioned piece for the 1991 centennial celebration of New York's Carnegie Hall, where it was premiered by cabaret singer Andrea Marcovicci.  The work crosses over the lines from classical music to Broadway to cabaret and has been recorded in German, French, Polish, and six times in English, including as December Songs for Voice and Orchestra (2022), featuring orchestration by Larry Hochman and Victoria Clark as soloist.

Titanic
The discovery of the wreckage of the R.M.S. Titanic in 1985 attracted Yeston's interest in writing a musical about the famous disaster. "What drew me to the project was the positive aspects of what the ship represented – 1) humankind's striving after great artistic works and similar technological feats, despite the possibility of tragic failure, and 2) the dreams of the passengers on board: 3rd Class, to immigrate to America for a better life; 2nd Class, to live a leisured lifestyle in imitation of the upper classes; 1st Class, to maintain their privileged positions forever. The collision with the iceberg dashed all of these dreams simultaneously, and the subsequent transformation of character of the passengers and crew had, it seemed to me, the potential for great emotional and musical expression onstage."  Librettist Peter Stone and Yeston knew that the idea was an unusual subject for a musical. "I think if you don't have that kind of daring damn-the-torpedoes, you shouldn't be in this business. It's the safe-sounding shows that often don't do well. You have to dare greatly, and I really want to stretch the bounds of the kind of expression in musical theater," Yeston explained.  Yeston saw the story as unique to turn-of-the-century British culture, with its rigid social class system and its romanticization of progress through technology. "In order to depict that on the stage, because this is really a very English show, I knew I would have to have a color similar to the one found in the music of the great composers at that time, like Elgar or Vaughan Williams; this was for me an opportunity to bring in the musical theater an element of the symphonic tradition that I think we really haven't had before. That was very exciting."

The high cost of the Titanic musical set made it impossible for the show to have traditional out-of-town tryouts.  Titanic opened at Broadway's Lunt-Fontanne Theatre in 1997 to mixed reviews. The New Yorker offered positive assessment from the press: "It seemed a foregone conclusion that the show would be a failure; a musical about history's most tragic maiden voyage, in which fifteen hundred people lost their lives, was obviously preposterous....  Astonishingly, Titanic manages to be grave and entertaining, somber and joyful; little by little you realize that you are in the presence of a genuine addition to American musical theatre."  The show was championed by Rosie O'Donnell, who talked about the musical regularly on her daytime talk show, inviting the cast to perform songs and giving theatre tickets to members of her studio audiences. This publicity, combined with major wins at the Tony Awards, sweeping all five categories in which it was nominated including Best Score, Best Book, and Best Musical, enabled it to outlast its competition.  It ran for 804 performances and 26 previews, toured America for three years, and has had national and international productions ever since. A 2013 Southwark Theatre production in London, reduced to 20 actors and a smaller orchestra, swept all the Off-West End Awards as Best Musical Production. That production became a template for the next 7 years, touring 16 cities in the UK, Germany, and China, and having worldwide productions in Japan, Korea, Australia, Germany, Holland, Belgium, Hungary, and all across America.

2011 and beyond
In 1999 Yeston was commissioned by the Kennedy Center to write a three-movement orchestral work for the millennium celebration -- An American Cantata, which was performed by the National Symphony Orchestra under the baton of Leonard Slatkin at the Lincoln Memorial in July 2000, with a chorus of 2000 voices.  The piece was highly praised by the Washington Post, comparing its score to Copland and Randall Thompson, and singling out in particular the second movement, which has a text from Martin Luther King Jr.'s  Memphis speech he gave the day before his death with the theme I have been to the mountaintop and I have seen the promised land." Coretta Scott King had given Yeston permission to set the speech to music for the occasion. Orchestrated by Yeston, the piece celebrates the evolution of the idea of individual liberty and equality, along with our inherent and universal entitlement to it, as our civilization's  greatest intellectual achievement of the past 1,000 years. Sung by a mixed chorus, children's choir, and gospel choir, texts include excerpts from the Magna Carta, and the writings of Thomas Jefferson, in addition to the Memphis Speech, and original lyrics by the composer. Subsequently, after composing the incidental music for Broadway's 2009 revival of The Royal Family, Yeston wrote the music and lyrics to Death Takes a Holiday, a musical version of the play La Morte in Vacanza by Alberto Casella (later a film called Death Takes a Holiday), with a book by Peter Stone and Thomas Meehan. It played in the summer of 2011 Off-Broadway at the Laura Pels Theatre.  The musical was nominated in eleven categories for the 2011–12 Drama Desk Awards, including Best Musical, Music and Lyrics. It was also nominated for an Outer Critics Circle Award for Outstanding Musical and Score, and cited as one of Time Magazine's top ten plays and musicals of the 2011 season.

In 2011, Yeston's original ballet Tom Sawyer: A Ballet in Three Acts premiered at the Kauffman Center for the Performing Arts in Kansas City, Missouri, with the Kansas City Ballet. Alastair Macaulay's review in The New York Times observed: "It's quite likely that this is the first all-new, entirely American three-act ballet: it is based on an American literary classic, has an original score by an American composer and was given its premiere by an American choreographer and company. ... Both the score and the choreography are energetic, robust, warm, deliberately naïve (both ornery and innocent), in ways right for Twain."

In 2020 Anything Can Happen In the Theater – The Musical World of Maury Yeston, a revue created and directed by Gerard Alessandrini, at the York Theatre in Manhattan. Elisabeth Vincentelli of The New York Times called it "the forlorn elegance of 'A Man Like You/Unusual Way', works perfectly fine outside of Nine. As with Yeston's best songs, its deceiving simplicity feels inevitable" and "its closing song, 'Home', is among the most beautiful of the last 30 years – its ineffable melancholy is sublime."In October 2020 on the PS Classics Label, Yeston released Maury Sings Yeston: The Demos, a compendium of his own vocal recordings of forty of his classic Demos.

Assessment
According to Show Music magazine, Yeston "has written some of the most formally structured music in recent musical theatre.  But he also has the gift for creating ravishing melody – once you've heard 'Love Can't Happen' from Grand Hotel, or 'Unusual Way' from Nine, or 'Home' from Phantom, or any number of other Yeston songs, you'll be hooked."

Family
In 1995, Yeston married Julianne Waldhelm. He has three sons: Jake, Max, and Alex.

Work 
Broadway
Nine (1982; revived 2003)
Grand Hotel (1989)
Titanic (1997)
The Royal Family (2009)

Off-Broadway
Cloud Nine, (1981, incidental music for the Caryl Churchill work. Theatre de Lys in NYC and production in Chicago)
In the Beginning (1987; workshopped as 1-2-3-4-5 at Manhattan Theatre Club) Book by Larry Gelbart
Death Takes a Holiday (2011)
 Anything Can Happen In The Theatre (2020)  Revue at York Theatre

Film
Nine (2009), 

Ballet
Tom Sawyer: A Ballet in Three Acts a 90-minute story Ballet, commissioned by Kansas City Ballet (2011)

Other works
Goya: A Life In Song (1989; one of Barbra Streisand's pop hits, "Till I Loved You" is from the show)
Phantom, with a Book by Arthur Kopit (1991) Productions worldwide.
December Songs, a song cycle commissioned by Carnegie Hall for their Centennial celebration (1991).
An American Cantata (2000), for orchestra and 2000 voices, commissioned by The Kennedy Center, a choral symphony in three movements, which premiered on the steps of the Lincoln Memorial by the National Symphony Orchestra, conducted by Leonard Slatkin
The Peony Pavilion, a musical adaption of The Peony Pavilion, 2012, commissioned by the People's Republic of China, only workshopped

Concert
Concerto for Cello and Orchestra, premiered by Yo-Yo Ma, Sir Gilbert Levine conductor.
December Songs – for voice and orchestra (2022)
Sonata for Piano
Aube, (Arthur Rimbaud) for soprano and chamber orchestra
Five Ecstatic Songs – for soprano and piano
Trilogues for Three String Quartets
Song for Violin and Piano
My Grandmother's Love Letters (Hart Crane), for voice and piano

Publications
The Stratification of Musical Rhythm (1975 Yale University Press)
Readings in Schenker Analysis and Other Approaches (1977 Yale University Press)
Rubato and the Middleground, Journal of Music Theory. Vol. 19. No. 2. (Autumn, 1975). pp. 286-301

Awards and recognition
 Tony Award for Best Original Score (1982) (Nine)
 Drama Desk Award for Outstanding Music (1982) (Nine)
 Drama Desk Award for Outstanding Lyrics (1982) (Nine)
 Nominee for Tony Award for Best Original Score in 1990 (Grand Hotel)
 Nominee for the Drama Desk Award for Outstanding Music in 1990 (Grand Hotel)
 Nominee for the Drama Desk Award for Outstanding Lyrics in 1990 (Grand Hotel)
 Tony Award for Best Original Score (1997) (Titanic)
 Nominee for Grammy Award for Best Musical Show Album, 1983 (Nine)
 Nominee for Grammy Award for Best Musical Show Album, 1998 (Titanic)
 Nominee for Grammy Award for Best Musical Show Album, 2004 (Nine)
 Laurence Olivier Award 2005 (Grand Hotel)
 Nominee for Academy Award for Best Original Song – "Take It All" in 2010 (Nine)
 Nominee for Golden Globe Award for Best Original Song – "Cinema Italiano" in 2010 (Nine)
 Nominee for Broadcast Film Critics Association Award for Best Original Song ("Cinema Italiano")
 Nominee for Satellite Award for Best Original Song ("Cinema Italiano")
 Nominee for the Drama Desk Award for Outstanding Music in 2012 (Death Takes a Holiday)
 Nominee for the Drama Desk Award for Outstanding Lyrics in 2012 (Death Takes a Holiday)
 ACE Award -Association of Latin Entertainment Critics Argentine award – Mejor Musical for "Nueve"
 Ambassador of The Society of Composers and Lyricists
 Honorary Doctorate in Music, DMA Five Towns College 2004
 Elaine Kaufman Cultural Center Creative Arts Award, 1998
 Kayden Visiting Artist, Harvard University
 Emerson College Leonidas A. Nicklole Artist of Distinction Award, 2017
 Sheldon Harnick Award For Creative Excellence, 2020

Discography
Nine: original Broadway cast (1982; Grammy Award nomination), Nine 2003 Broadway revival cast (2004; Grammy Award nomination) London Festival Hall Concert and others in French, German, Dutch, Japanese, Swedish and Polish
The Film version of Nine, (Soundtrack recording): Daniel Day-Lewis, Marion Cotillard, Penélope Cruz, Judi Dench, Fergie, Kate Hudson, Nicole Kidman, Sophia Loren
Goya: A Life in Song, Placido Domingo, Gloria Estefan. Dionne Warwick, Richie Havens, (original studio cast, 1989)
December Songs (English) Andrea Marcovicci, Harolyn Blackwell, Laura Osnes, Victoria Clark (with orchestra), (German) Pia Douwes, (Polish) Edyta Krzemień, (French) Isabelle Georges
Grand Hotel (original Broadway cast, 1992)
Phantom (original cast recording, 1993)
Titanic (original Broadway cast (1997; Grammy Award nomination), original Dutch cast, original German Hamburg cast)
The Maury Yeston Songbook (2003; a compilation of 20 songs recorded by Betty Buckley, Christine Ebersole, Laura Benanti, Sutton Foster, Alice Ripley, Johnny Rodgers and others)
Death Takes a Holiday (original off-Broadway cast recording, 2011)
Tom Sawyer: A Ballet in Three Acts (San Francisco Ballet Orchestra 2011), recorded at Skywalker Sound, 2013
Laura Osnes – If I Tell You: The Songs of Maury Yeston (2013, Laura Osnes, singer)
Anything Can Happen In The Theatre-The Musical World of Maury Yeston (original off-Broadway cast recording, 2020)
Maury Sings Yeston - The Demos (a compendium of 40 of Yeston's classic Demos, sung and accompanied on piano by Yeston, recorded over a period of 40 years) 2020
Christmas in the Stars: Star Wars Christmas Album (1980)
December Songs for Voice and Orchestra, featuring Victoria Clark as soloist (2022)

Notes

References
Laurents, Arthur. Mainly on Directing: Gypsy, West Side Story, and Other Musicals, New York: Knopf (2009).

Further reading
New York Times, May 9, 1982, sect.2, pp. 1, 24; May 10, 1982, p. C13; May 23, 1982; pp. D3, 23; May 23, 1997, sect. 2, p. 6; April 24, 1997, p. C13; June 1, 1997, sect. 2, p. 1; June 2, 1997, p. B1, July 20, 1997, sect. 2, p. 5.
Newsweek, May 5, 1997, p. 70-73.
Rubato and The Middleground

External links
Official website
 Maury Yeston at the Internet Off-Broadway Database
 
2008 interview with Yeston at Broadway.com
Pogrebin, Robin.  "A Song in His Psyche, As Hummable as Fame". The New York Times, May 19, 2003
Information about Yeston's recordings
2003 review of "The Maury Yeston Songbook"
2000 review of "In the Beginning"
"Why I Took a Classical Break from Broadway The New York Times, June 25, 2000

20th-century American composers
1945 births
American musical theatre composers
Jewish American composers
Jewish American songwriters
Broadway composers and lyricists
Living people
Musicians from Jersey City, New Jersey
American people of English descent
Yale College alumni
Alumni of Clare College, Cambridge
American musicologists
21st-century American Jews
Tony Award winners